Rickard Rydell (born 22 September 1967) is a retired Swedish racing driver. He won the 1998 British Touring Car Championship, the 2011 Scandinavian Touring Car Championship, and has also been a frontrunner in the European/World Touring Car Championship.

Early career
Rydell was born in Vallentuna, Stockholm. Initially he trained to be an accountant at AB Rydell, his family's flower boutique business, but was bitten by the racing bug. In the early 1990s, he raced in various Formula Three series. He also won pole position in the 1991 Macau Grand Prix, and won the 1992 race. He competed in Japanese F3 in 1992 and 1993, British F3 in 1989 and 1991, and the Swedish F3 series in 1987 and 1988. In 1990, he raced in F3000. In 1984–1985, he won the Swedish 100cc go kart championship.

Touring cars

BTCC

His first year in the BTCC was 1994, when his car was quite distinctive, driving a Volvo 850 Estate, when it was normal to race saloons. The TWR team switched to a saloon in 1995 and Rydell took pole for 13 of the 24 races, but due to several slow starts he won only 4 times and he finished on podium 7 times. At the end of the year he was third in the championship, a result repeated in 1996 although Audi dominated with Frank Biela he was able to score 4 victories and 6 podium. In 1997 Volvo switch from 850 saloon to new model Volvo S40, at the end of year he was fourth with 1 victory and 5 podium. In 1998, he finally won the BTCC title in a Volvo with 5 victories and 12 podium, beating Anthony Reid at the final meeting. He also won the 1998 Super Touring Bathurst 1000, sharing a Volvo S40 with Jim Richards.
In 1999 he was again third behind the two Nissan Primera with 4 victories and 7 podium.

After five years with Volvo, he was loaned to Ford (Prodrive) for 2000 where he finished for the fourth time in seven years third behind his two teammates Alain Menu and Anthony Reid.

ETCC

He spent 2001 largely waiting for his ETCC Volvo S60 to be built, but he raced a Ferrari 550 Maranello in the FIA GT Championship for the Prodrive team. In 2002 he raced in the ETCC finishing 5th with 8 podiums while in 2003, without official Volvo's support, he finished just 11th with only 2 podiums.

He moved to SEAT's SEAT Sport team in 2004 for the ETCC driving Seat Toledo Cupra ending 10th with 1 victory and 1 podium. In 2004 he also took part in two races in the Swedish Touring Car Championship, claiming one victory.

WTCC

2005 season
SEAT and Rydell continued in the World Touring Car Championship (WTCC) when it replaced the ETCC for 2005. He finished sixth in the championship, winning race two at Silverstone and 4 podium.

2006 season
He continued with SEAT for 2006, finishing seventh, with just 4 podium.

2007 season

Rydell lost his SEAT drive for 2007, and instead drove an Aston Martin DBR9 with the Prodrive team in the GT Championship having previously worked with the team when using Ferrari's in 2004.

Rydell raced in the 2007 24 Hours of Le Mans with David Brabham and Darren Turner and they won in the GT1 class.

On the WTCC weekend in Anderstorp, Sweden, Rydell returned to the category as a fourth driver for the Chevrolet team and a local hero guest driver. He won the second race of the day, ahead of teammates Nicola Larini and Alain Menu ignoring the team order not to attack their teammate, in particular Larini who was fighting for the title championship and losing the opportunity to continue with RML until the end of the season.

Prior to the last event of the 2007 WTCC calendar in Macau, Rydell was chosen by the SEAT Sport team to race for them as an additional driver to help the team take home at least one of the main championships, either the Driver's championship via SEAT's Yvan Muller winning, or the Manufacturer's championship. The weekend though did not set off as planned, due to Rickard starting 14th on the race 1 grid and Yvan Muller started 2nd behind the eventual winner of the first race Alain Menu in the RML run Chevrolet. Rickard finished 11th in the first race with Yvan Muller leading 8 of the 9 laps of the race, but due to a fuel pressure problem Muller's race weekend ended on the 8th lap even before he was able to get to the pits. During the second race Rickard had a much better race than the first as he finished in 6th, but unfortunately his efforts were not enough to help SEAT clinch the Manufacturer's crowns, as the championship went to the reigning Manufacturer's champions BMW.

2008 season

Rydell was re-signed by SEAT as one of their drivers in their five strong driver line up for an assault on the 2008 WTCC season. Rickard finished fifth in the final standings, winning once at Estoril and once at Okayama.

2009 season
Rickard raced for SEAT yet again in 2009, winning at Puebla and finishing seventh overall in the final standings.

2011 season

Rickard Rydell returns to racing after a year as a commentator of the STCC for Swedish TV. He was signed to Chevrolet Motorsport Sweden team with the Cruze joining as team with his teammate Viktor Hallrup a developmental driver for the team in his second season with the team, with first season being with the Lacetti. Rickard came in as a booster driver for Chevrolet Sweden to gain results for the team as their developmental driver was still not up to speed with the top runners. Rickard won the title* at the last race of the season at Mantorp by just 2 points to Frederik Ekblom.

 This is under debate for Rydell passing under yellows which are not present till Turn 2, but Volkswagen (VW) Team Biogas.se brought in former STCC champion Thed Bjork, and he slowed down before Turn 1 letting three cars past before the first yellow flag light. At present VW have appealed and failed 3 times fourth might be soon.

The two pieces of evidence that Volkswagen Team Biogas.se brought in: 
Photo and Video, both illustrated on touringcartimes.com

This is Rydell Second National Touring car title after the BTCC championship in 1998, although he won the Bathurst 1000 that year also which was his last touring car title before his return to form in 2011.

Next year he will be defending his STCC title however, Frederik Ekblom will not be contesting in the STCC as he has signed with Volvo Polestar in the silhouette touring car championship run by the TTA which is based on a Volvo C30 chassis and many teams and successful Swedish drivers, i.e. Jan "Flash" Nilsson and Richard Göransson  , who were STCC BMW drivers in the 2011 season.

2013 season
Rydell joined NIKA Racing for the 2013 FIA WTCC Race of China to drive their Chevrolet Cruze 1.6T.

In a 2005 poll run by Motorsport Magazine, Rydell was voted 18th greatest touring car driver of all time.

Rydell announced his retirement from motorsport in early 2016.

GT racing

Rydell raced in the 2001 FIA GT Championship for Prodrive, after the team had built a Ferrari 550-GTS Maranello. The aim was to showcase the competitiveness of the car and tempt potential race teams to buy the vehicle from Prodrive. Consequently, there were numerous drivers of the vehicle that season, Rickard being one of them. He drove five races that year, finishing 3rd at the Nurburgring and two overall victories at the A1 Ring and Jarama respectively.

He moved back to touring cars for his full-time programmes from 2002, but competed with Prodrive in the Ferrari again at the 2002 24 Hours of Le Mans, sadly retiring. For the 2004 24 Hours of Le Mans the Prodrive Ferrari-Rydell combination finished on the GTS-class podium in third, Rickard sharing the car with Darren Turner and rally-driver Colin McRae.

After a hiatus of two years, Rickard once again teamed up with Prodrive for the 2007 24 Hours of Le Mans, this time in an Aston Martin DBR9. Sharing the car with Darren Turner and David Brabham, Rydell won the GT1 class.

Racing record

Complete 24 Hours of Le Mans results

Complete Japanese Formula 3000 results
(key) (Races in bold indicate pole position; races in italics indicate fastest lap)

Complete British Touring Car Championship results
(key) (Races in bold indicate pole position – 1 point awarded 1996 onwards in all races) (Races in italics indicate fastest lap) (* signifies that driver lead feature race for at least one lap – 1 point given)

Complete Swedish Touring Car Championship results
(key) (Races in bold indicate pole position) (Races in italics indicate fastest lap)

Complete European Touring Car Championship results
(key) (Races in bold indicate pole position) (Races in italics indicate fastest lap)

Complete V8 Supercar Championship results

Complete World Touring Car Championship results
(key) (Races in bold indicate pole position) (Races in italics indicate fastest lap)

Complete Scandinavian Touring Car Championship results
(key) (Races in bold indicate pole position) (Races in italics indicate fastest lap)

Complete Bathurst 1000 results

* Super Touring race

References

External links 

 
 

1967 births
Living people
People from Vallentuna Municipality
Swedish racing drivers
Japanese Formula 3000 Championship drivers
Swedish Formula Three Championship drivers
British Formula Three Championship drivers
Japanese Formula 3 Championship drivers
24 Hours of Le Mans drivers
FIA GT Championship drivers
World Touring Car Championship drivers
British Touring Car Championship drivers
British Touring Car Championship Champions
Swedish Touring Car Championship drivers
TC 2000 Championship drivers
International Formula 3000 drivers
British Formula 3000 Championship drivers
Bathurst 1000 winners
Supercars Championship drivers
European Touring Car Championship drivers
Sportspeople from Stockholm County
Aston Martin Racing drivers
TOM'S drivers
Cupra Racing drivers